
Gmina Rakoniewice is an urban-rural gmina (administrative district) in Grodzisk Wielkopolski County, Greater Poland Voivodeship, in west-central Poland.

Villages
Apart from the town of Rakoniewice, Gmina Rakoniewice contains the villages and settlements of Adolfowo, Blinek, Błońsko, Cegielsko, Drzymałowo, Elżbieciny, Faustynowo, Głodno, Gnin, Gola, Goździn, Jabłonna, Józefin, Komorówko, Kuźnica Zbąska, Łąkie, Łąkie Nowe, Narożniki, Rakoniewice-Wieś, Rataje, Rostarzewo, Ruchocice, Stodolsko, Tarnowa, Terespol, Wioska and Wola Jabłońska.

Neighbouring gminas
Gmina Rakoniewice is bordered by the gminas of Grodzisk Wielkopolski, Kamieniec, Nowy Tomyśl, Przemęt, Siedlec, Wielichowo and Wolsztyn.

References

Polish official population figures 2006

Rakoniewice
Grodzisk Wielkopolski County